The lined tree frog (Litoria quadrilineata) is a species of frog in the subfamily Pelodryadinae, endemic to West Papua, Indonesia.
Its natural habitats are swamps and urban areas.

References

Litoria
Amphibians of Western New Guinea
Amphibians described in 1974
Taxonomy articles created by Polbot